Zhao Jiuyi is a Taiwanese actor in the early 2010s he is mostly famous for “Flowers Bloom in Winter”, The Resistance and “Ip Man 3”.
He was born in 1985 as Zhao Jun Long but he renamed himself due to his popularity in China.

Career
Zhao Jiuyi made his fame debut in The Resistance. His charm and acting took China by storm and he continued acting in Taiwanese, Hong Kong, and China in TV Series. His first leading role were in the Taiwanese Chinese TV drama “Flowers Bloom in Winter” and he had a small part in the Donnie Yen movie “Ip Man 3”. His latest work were in the action comedy series “A Detectives Housewife”.

Filmography

Movies
The Resistance (2011)
Ip Man 3 (2016)

TV series
Flowers Bloom In Winter
Destined To Love You
A Detectives Housewife

References
Touying Movies - http://www.tuoyingmovie.com/news_115.php
Xingz news - http://www.xingz.cn/f/48441
Xinhuanet news -

External links

1985 births
Living people
21st-century Taiwanese male actors
Central Academy of Drama alumni
Taiwanese male film actors
Taiwanese male television actors